Alexey Alexeyevich Denisenko (born 30 August 1993) is a Russian taekwondo practitioner. He won a bronze medal at the 2012 Olympics in the 58 kg division and a silver at the 2016 Rio Games in the 68 weight category. In 2012 and 2016 he was awarded the Medal of the Order "For Merit to the Fatherland" (of the second and first degree, respectively).

In December 2016, Denisenko married Russian taekwondo fighter Anastasia Baryshnikova. He is of Gypsie descent.

References

External links

 

1993 births
Living people
Russian male taekwondo practitioners
Olympic taekwondo practitioners of Russia
Taekwondo practitioners at the 2012 Summer Olympics
Olympic silver medalists for Russia
Olympic bronze medalists for Russia
Olympic medalists in taekwondo
Medalists at the 2012 Summer Olympics
Medalists at the 2016 Summer Olympics
Taekwondo practitioners at the 2015 European Games
European Games medalists in taekwondo
European Games bronze medalists for Russia
Taekwondo practitioners at the 2016 Summer Olympics
World Taekwondo Championships medalists
European Taekwondo Championships medalists
People from Bataysk
Sportspeople from Rostov Oblast
21st-century Russian people
20th-century Russian people